Derevenki is a rural locality (a settlement at the railway halt) in Vyshnederevensky Selsoviet Rural Settlement, Lgovsky District, Kursk Oblast, Russia. Population:

Geography 
The settlement is located 36 km from the Russia–Ukraine border, 63 km south-west of Kursk, 16 km south-east of the district center – the town Lgov, 6 km from the selsoviet center – Vyshniye Derevenki.

 Climate
Derevenki has a warm-summer humid continental climate (Dfb in the Köppen climate classification).

Transport 
Derevenki is located 8.5 km from the road of regional importance  (Kursk – Lgov – Rylsk – border with Ukraine), 5 km from the road  (Lgov – Sudzha), on the road of intermunicipal significance  (38K-024 – Vyshniye Derevenki – Durovo-Bobrik), next to the (closed) railway halt Derevenki (railway line Lgov I — Podkosylev).

The rural locality is situated 70 km from Kursk Vostochny Airport, 129 km from Belgorod International Airport and 270 km from Voronezh Peter the Great Airport.

References

Notes

Sources

Rural localities in Lgovsky District